Teater Tribunalen (commonly known as Tribunalen) is a popular independent Swedish theatre group in Stockholm.

The theatre group was created in 1995 by a group of students from the Swedish National Academy of Mime and Acting ("Scenskolan") in Malmö and by students from the Swedish Institute of Dramatic Art (Dramatiska Institutet) in Stockholm.

Teater Tribunalen is an outspoken political theatre group interested in influencing the society by challenging politic power, the government and nationally-debated issues with their work.

In the spring of 2012, Ellen Nyman will direct “A performance of Swedish Arms Exports”( En föreställning om svensk vapenexport) at Teater Tribunalen. The goal is to initiate a national referendum on Swedish arms export.

References

External links
 Teater Tribunalen (official site)

Tribunalen